Yeh Chin-fong (born 22 June 1943) is a Taiwanese politician. She was the Minister of Justice from 1999 to 2000.

Minister of Justice

1999 judicial person of the year
In January 2000, Yeh was chosen as the Judicial Person of the Year for 1999.

2001 Changhua County magistrate election
On 1 December 2001, Yeh joined the Changhua County magistrate election from Kuomintang. However, she lost to Democratic Progressive Party (DPP) candidate Wong Chin-chu.

References

Taiwanese Ministers of Justice
Living people
1943 births
Taiwanese Ministers of the Interior
Female justice ministers
Female interior ministers
Women government ministers of Taiwan
Kuomintang politicians in Taiwan